The Z23 class (formerly O.446 class) was a class of steam locomotives built in 1891 for the New South Wales Government Railways in Australia.

Royal Commission 

Although this may have been the result of a contemporary anti-American bias, these locomotives were said to be too heavy and too wide at the cylinders, and were the subject of a Royal Commission.

Withdrawal 

2305 was the first withdrawn in May 1933. By 1941, only six were left, with the last, 2304, being withdrawn in September 1946. None has survived onto preservation.

See also 
NSWGR steam locomotive classification

References 

23
Scrapped locomotives
Standard gauge locomotives of Australia
Baldwin locomotives
4-6-0 locomotives